Hana Laszlo (born 14 June 1953) is an Israeli actress, television presenter and comedian. In 2005, she won a Cannes Film Festival Award for Best Actress for her performance in the film Free Zone. She has also received four Ophir Award nominations.

Early and personal life 
Laszlo was born in Jaffa, Tel Aviv to a family of Ashkenazi Jewish descent. Her parents were Holocaust survivors who were born in Poland.

In 1972–1973, she served in the Israel Defense Forces Southern Command's musical troupe. Around those years she was in a relationship with Israeli pop-star Svika Pick.

She met her first husband, Israeli media proprietor Aviv Giladi, on the set of Uri Zohar's Save The Lifeguard. The two proceeded to work together on various stage productions and eventually got married in 1979.

Laszlo has two sons from her first marriage – Ben and Ithamar. Her eldest,  Ben Giladi, is a film and television producer. Her daughter-in-law is Israeli actress and filmmaker Romi Aboulafia, with whom she frequently collaborates.

Laszlo married and divorced businessman Benny Bloch.

Career 

Laszlo rose to enormous success in the 1980s and 1990s in the wake of character-driven comedy routines. She created and portrayed some of the most iconic characters of that era – including such characters as 'Safta Zapta' and 'Clara the Cleaning Lady.'

Through the 90s, Laszlo was the highest grossing female entertainer in Israel. However, due to financial and personal calamity, her career came to a halt in the beginning of the new millennium.

After several silent years, Laszlo restarted building her career from the ground up. She was reintroduced to the public and younger crowd through her role as Naomi Shahar in the highly successful musical telenovela HaShir Shelanu.

In 2005 she won the Best Actress Award at the 2005 Cannes Film Festival for her role in Free Zone. Laszlo stars in the film alongside Natalie Portman. The Palme d'Or marked the pick of Laszlo's comeback.

From 2002–2004, Laszlo was one of two presenters (the other being Pnina Dvorin) of the Israeli version of the British television game show The Weakest Link.

In 2010, she served as a judge with Claude Dadia and Eli Mizrachi on Rokdim Im Kokhavim, the Israeli version of Dancing with the Stars.

Laszlo wrote, produced, financed and starred in more than a dozen one-woman shows since the 1980s. She spends a third of the year on stage with them.

In 2019, she received an honorary PhD from Bar-Ilan University for contributions to the stage arts. She never had formal education but speaks and performs in six different languages – Hebrew, English, Yiddish, French, German and Dutch.

Laszlo performed the voice of Nai Nai in the Hebrew-Language dub of the 2019 animated film Abominable.

She's destined to play Paulette in the Hebrew version of Legally Blonde.

Filmography

Awards and recognition 
2005 Cannes Film Festival
Best Actress Award for Free Zone
Ophir Award for Best Actress for Free Zone (nomination)
Ophir Award for Best Supporting Actress for Alila (nomination)

See also 
Women in Israel
Theater of Israel
Israeli cinema
Television in Israel

References

External links 

1953 births
Living people
People from Jaffa
Actresses from Tel Aviv
Israeli film actresses
Israeli stage actresses
Israeli television actresses
Israeli female comedians
20th-century Israeli Jews
21st-century Israeli Jews
Jewish Israeli actresses
Jewish Israeli comedians
Israeli people of Polish-Jewish descent
Israeli television talk show hosts
Israeli women television presenters
20th-century Israeli actresses
21st-century Israeli actresses
20th-century Israeli comedians
21st-century Israeli comedians
Cannes Film Festival Award for Best Actress winners
Israeli Ashkenazi Jews